The 1973 Women's Cricket World Cup was the inaugural Women's Cricket World Cup, held in England between 20 June and 28 July 1973. It was the first tournament of its kind, held two years before the first limited overs World Cup for men in 1975. The competition was won by the hosts, England. The competition was the brainchild of businessman Sir Jack Hayward, who contributed £40,000 towards its costs.

England, Australia, New Zealand, Trinidad and Tobago and Jamaica were joined by an International XI and a Young England side in a round robin league which saw the top team win the World Cup. England topped the group with 20 points from their six matches, including five victories and one defeat, while Australia were runners up posting 17 points with four wins.

The final round robin match, held at Edgbaston on 28 July, was distinguished by a commanding century by Enid Bakewell of England, whose 118 formed the bedrock of England's imposing 279/3 in their 60 overs, with captain Rachael Heyhoe Flint scoring 64. Australia were restricted by tight England bowling and fell well short of their target, scoring 187/9. The cup was presented by Princess Anne and the winning England team were hosted at a reception at 10 Downing Street by Prime Minister Edward Heath.

Bakewell, one of England's finest all time players, was the leading run-scorer in the competition with 264 runs while Rosalind Heggs, of Young England, was the leading wicket-taker with 12 wickets. The next World Cup was held five years later in 1978.

Standings

Matches

New Zealand vs Jamaica

Australia vs Young England

England vs International XI

New Zealand vs Trinidad & Tobago

Trinidad & Tobago vs Australia

New Zealand vs International XI

Jamaica vs England

Jamaica vs Trinidad & Tobago

Australia vs New Zealand

England vs Jamaica

Young England vs International XI

Australia vs Jamaica

New Zealand vs England

Jamaica vs International XI

Young England vs Trinidad & Tobago

England vs Young England

International XI vs Trinidad & Tobago

Trinidad & Tobago vs England

International XI vs Australia

Young England vs New Zealand

England v Australia

Statistics

Most runs

Most wickets

Notes

References

External links
 Results - Women's World Cup 1973 ESPN Cricinfo
 RNZ: New Zealand set to host women's Cricket World Cup 49 years after the first one – includes discussion of 1973 Women's Cricket World Cup from a New Zealand perspective 

 
1973
1973 in women's cricket
World Cup 1973
1973 in English cricket
June 1973 sports events in the United Kingdom
July 1973 sports events in the United Kingdom